Sərkarlar (also, Sarkyarlar and Sərkərlar) is a village and municipality in the Barda Rayon of Azerbaijan.  It has a population of 302.

References

Populated places in Barda District